Circle Hits the Flame – Best Off... is the second compilation album by Danish rock band Sort Sol, released on 4 March 2002. The album contains songs from the band's four studio albums released between 1991 and 2002 (Flow My Firetear, Glamourpuss, Unspoiled Monsters, and Snakecharmer). It also includes the three new songs, "Holler High", "Golden Wonder" and "Circle Hits the Flame". The first two are co-written with Søren Rasted of Aqua-fame. "Circle Hits the Flame" is an English translation of "Når solen stikker af", a song recorded for the Danish radio program Tværs in 1994. The album's release was preceded by the lead single "Holler High" in February 2002. The album peaked at number one in Denmark, and was certified platinum by the International Federation of the Phonographic Industry (IFPI) for shipments of 50,000 copies.

Track listing

Personnel 
 Steen Jørgensen – vocals
 Tomas Ortved – drums
 Lars Top-Galia – guitar, bass, keyboards and bells
 Knud Odde – bass and backing and additional vocals
 Peter Schneidenman – guitars and backing vocals

Charts and certifications

Charts

Certifications

References 

2002 greatest hits albums
Punk rock compilation albums